Princess Pauline Metternich on the Beach is mid-19th-century painting by French artist Eugène Boudin. Done in oil on cardboard, laid down on wood, the work depicts Pauline von Metternich, the wife of the Austrian ambassador to the court of Napoleon III and a well-known fashion icon, looking out to sea from a beach in northern France.

The work is in the collection of the Metropolitan Museum of Art, New York city.

See also
 List of paintings by Eugène Boudin

References

1865 paintings
French paintings